An uthra or ʿutra (plural: ʿutri) is a "divine messenger of the light" in Mandaeism. Charles G. Häberl and James F. McGrath translate it as "excellency". Jorunn J. Buckley defines them as "Lightworld beings, called 'utras (sing.: 'utra 'wealth', but meaning 'angel' or 'guardian')." Aldihisi (2008) compares them to the yazata of Zoroastrianism. According to Ethel S. Drower, "an 'uthra is an ethereal being, a spirit of light and Life."

Uthras are benevolent beings that live in škinas (celestial dwellings) in the World of Light (alma ḏ-nhūra) and communicate with each other via telepathy. Uthras are also occasionally mentioned as being in anana ("clouds"; e.g., in Right Ginza Book 17, Chapter 1), which can also be interpreted as female consorts. Many uthras also serve as guardians (naṭra); for instance, Shilmai and Nidbai are the guardians of Piriawis, the Great Jordan (yardna) of Life.

Etymology
Uthra is typically considered to be cognate with Aramaic ʿuṯrā ‘riches’, derived from the Semitic root *w-t-r ‘to exceed’. Based on this etymology, E. S. Drower suggests a parallel with the South Arabian storm god Attar, who provides irrigation for the people.

However, this etymology is disputed by Charles G. Häberl (2017), who suggests it is the ʾaqtal pattern noun *awtərā "excellency".

Naming
Uthras often have the term Ziwa / Ziua ( "Radiance') attached after their names, due to their origins from the World of Light. In Manichaeism, the Syriac term Ziwa is also used to refer to Jesus as Ishoʿ Ziwā (Jesus the Splendor), who is sent to awaken Adam and Eve to the source of the spiritual light trapped within their physical bodies.

Pairs of uthras also typically have rhyming names. The names can be alliterative (e.g., Adathan and Yadathan), or one name may have an infixed consonant or syllable (e.g., Kapan and Kanpan). In Manichaeism, pairs of celestial beings can also have rhyming names, such as Xroshtag and Padvaxtag. Gardner (2010) discusses other parallels with Manichaeism.

List of uthras

Commonly mentioned uthras
Below is a partial list of uthras. Some names of uthras are always listed together as pairs.

Manda d-Hayyi, the savior uthra
The triad consisting of the 3 sons of Adam according to Book 1 of the Left Ginza:
Hibil (Abel)
Shitil (Seth)
Anush (Enosh)
The emanations:
Yushamin (the Second Life): the primal uthra
Abatur (the Third Life): father of the uthras
Ptahil (the Fourth Life): the creator of the material world
Sam Ziwa (Shem): Shem is cognate with the angelic soteriological figure Sam Ziwa
Shilmai and Nidbai are a pair of uthras who serve as the guardian spirits (naṭra; plural: naṭria) of the Jordan and the delegates of Manda d-Hayyi, who carry out the work of God (Hayyi Rabbi). (See Xroshtag and Padvaxtag in Manichaeism.)
Adathan and Yadathan are a pair of uthras who stand at the Gate of Life, praising and worshipping God.

In the Ginza Rabba
Other uthras mentioned in the Ginza Rabba are:

Barbag (Bar-Bag), also called Azaziʿil – mentioned in Right Ginza 4 as the "head of the 444 škintas."
Bhaq Ziwa – uthra; also Abatur
Bihram – uthra of baptism
Bhir (meaning 'chosen, tested, proven') – mentioned as part of a pair with Bihrun in Right Ginza 8.
Bihrun – '[the Life] chose me'. Mentioned in Qolasta prayers 105 and 168, Right Ginza 8, and Mandaean Book of John 62.
Din Mlikh – uthra who appears in the revelation of Dinanukht
Gubran and Guban – mentioned in Right Ginza 5.1. In the Mandaean Book of John, Gubran Uthra helps Nbaṭ lead a rebellion against Yushamin and his 21 sons.
Ham Ziwa and Nhur Ziwa
Kapan and Kanpan
Nbaṭ – the King of Air, the first great Radiance
Nṣab – also called Nṣab Rabba and Nṣab Ziwa. Son of Yushamin. Frequently mentioned with Anan-Nṣab ('cloud of Nṣab', a female consort) as a pair. Mentioned in Right Ginza 8 and 17.1, and Qolasta prayers 25, 71, 105, 145, 168, 186, 353, and 379.
Nbaz (Nbaz Haila) – Mentioned in Right Ginza 1.4 and 6 as the guardian of a matarta. He is mentioned in Right Ginza 6 as "Nbaz-Haila, the Lord of Darkness, the great anvil of the earth."
Nurʿil and Nuriaʿil – mentioned in Right Ginza 5.1.
Piriawis Yardna – also a heavenly stream and personified vine (gupna)
Rahziʿil – mentioned in Right Ginza 11, in which he is described as "the well-armed one who (is) the smallest of his brothers."
Sam Mana Smira (Smir Ziwa 'pure first Radiance', or Sam Smir Ziwa; Smir means 'preserved') – one of the Twelve. Sam Mana Smira is mentioned in Qolasta prayers 9, 14, 28, 77, and 171, and Right Ginza 3 and 5.4. Yawar Mana Smira and Sam Smira Ziwa are mentioned in Right Ginza 14. Lidzbarski (1920) translates Sam Mana Smira as "Sām, the well-preserved Mānā."
Sar and Sarwan – mentioned in Qolasta prayers 25, 105, 168, and 378, and Right Ginza 5.1, 8, and 17.1.
Ṣaureil (Ṣaurʿil) – the angel of death; also an epithet for the Moon (Sén)
Shihlun (lit. '[The Life] has sent me')
Simat Hayyi – treasure of life; typically considered to be the wife of the uthra Yawar Ziwa
Tar and Tarwan. Tarwan is mentioned in Right Ginza 8 and in Qolasta prayer 105. The "land of Tarwan" is mentioned in Qolasta prayers 190 and 379 and Right Ginza 15.17, while "pure Tarwan" (taruan dakita), or sometimes "the pure land of Tarwan," is mentioned as a heavenly place in Right Ginza 15.2, 15.8, 15.16, and 16.1. "Tarwan-Nhura" (Tarwan of Light) is mentioned in Qolasta prayers 4 and 25.
ʿUrpʿil and Marpʿil
Yasana – mentioned in Right Ginza 12.1 as the "gate of Yasana."
Yathrun – father of Shilmai
Yawar Ziwa – Dazzling Radiance, also known as Yawar Kasia or Yawar Rabba; husband of Simat Hayyi. Yawar can also mean 'Helper.'
Yufin-Yufafin (Yupin-Yupapin)
Yukabar (Yukhabr) – mentioned in Qolasta prayers 74, 77, 173, and 379, and in Right Ginza 15.6 (as Yukabar-Kušṭa), 16.4, and 17.1 (as Yukabar-Ziwa). Yukabar helps Nbaṭ fight a rebellion against Yushamin in the Mandaean Book of John.
Yukašar (Yukhashr) – source of Radiance. Mentioned in Qolasta prayers 53, 54, 55, 64, 77, and 343, and in Right Ginza 4 as Yukašar-Kana (kana means 'place' or 'source'). In the Mandaean Book of John, he is portrayed as the son of Ptahil.
Yura (Yur) – "jewel". Mentioned in Right Ginza 15.7, 15.8, 16.1, and 17.1 as the (great) ganzibra or treasurer. Yur is also the name of one of the matarta guardians.
Yurba (spelled Jōrabba by Lidzbarski) – also called the fighter. Yurba is identified with Shamish, the sun. Book 18 of the Right Ginza equates Yurba with Adonai of Judaism, while Gelbert (2017) identifies Yurba with Yao. Mentioned in Right Ginza 3, 5.3 (which mentions Yurba as a matarta guardian), 8, 12.1, 15.5, and 18 and Left Ginza 2.22 and 3.45. Mandaean Book of John 52 is a narrative dedicated to Yurba. Yurba is often mentioned as engaging in conversation with Ruha.
Zarzeil Ziwa (Zarzʿil Ziwa) – mentioned in Right Ginza 5.1 and 15.8.
Zhir (meaning 'secured') – often mentioned as part of a pair with Zihrun
Zihrun (sometimes spelled as Zahrun; literally means 'the Life warned me') – Zihrun is mentioned in Right Ginza 4 as Zihrun-Uthra (also called Yusmir-Kana) and Right Ginza 8, and in Mandaean Book of John 62 as a "morning star." Qolasta prayers 2, 3, 240, and 319 mention him as Zihrun Raza ("Zihrun the Mystery"). He is described as an uthra of radiance, light, and glory in prayers 2 and 3, with prayer 2 mentioning Manda d-Hayyi as an emanation of Zihrun. Qolasta prayers 332, 340, 341, and 374 mention him as the name for a drabsha (banner), and prayer 347 mentions him as Zihrun-Šašlamiel. He is the subject of Zihrun Raza Kasia.

In Right Ginza 5.1, Yawar Ziwa appoints four uthras each over the four directions to watch over Ur (see also Guardians of the directions):
west: Azaziʿil, Azaziaʿil, Taqpʿil and Margazʿil the Great
east: ʿUrpʿil, Marpʿil, Taqpʿil and Hananʿil
north: Kanpan and Kapan, Gubran and Guban
south: Hailʿil, Qarbʿil, Nurʿil and Nuriaʿil

In the Qolasta
A few Qolasta prayers list the names of lesser-known uthras in sets of four. Mark J. Lofts (2010) considers them to be parallel to the Four Luminaries in Sethian Gnosticism. Qolasta prayers 17 and 77 list them as:

Rhum-Hai ("Mercy")
Īn-Hai ("Wellspring" or "Source of Life")
Šum-Hai ("Name")
Zamar-Hai ("Singer")

Qolasta prayer 49 lists the "four uthras" as:

Īn-Hai
Šum-Hai (Šum can mean both Shem and "Name")
Ziw-Hai ("Radiance")
Nhur-Hai ("Light")

These four uthras are considered to be the kings (malki) of the North Star who give strength and life to the sun. Together with Malka Ziwa (another name for Hayyi Rabbi), they make up the "five primal beings of light." Conversely, Mandaeans consider the "five lords of the World of Darkness" to be Zartai-Zartanai, Hag and Mag, Gap and Gapan, Šdum, and Krun (the paired demons are considered to rule together as single lords). (See  for similar parallels.)

In Qolasta prayers such as the Asiet Malkia, the word niṭufta (spelled niṭupta), which originally means 'drop' and has sometimes also been translated as 'cloud', is also often used as an appellation to refer to the consorts of uthras. It can also be interpreted as the semen or seed of the Father (Hayyi Rabbi), or a personified drop of "water of life".

Other minor uthras mentioned in the Qolasta are:
Hamgai-Ziwa, son of Hamgagai-Ziwa – mentioned in Qolasta prayer 3 and Right Ginza 15.5.
Hauran and Hauraran – mentioned in Qolasta prayers 14, 27, and 28. Hauraran is mentioned in Right Ginza 15.2, Left Ginza 3.60, and Mandaean Book of John 70.
Kanfiel – mentioned in Qolasta prayer 168
Karkawan-Ziwa – mentioned in Qolasta prayer 49
Rham and Rhamiel-Uthra – mentioned in Qolasta prayer 378
Ṣihiun, Pardun, and Kanfun – mentioned in Qolasta prayer 77
S'haq Ziwa (pronounced [sʰāq zīwā]) – mentioned in Qolasta prayers 18, 105, and 173. Š'haq is also mentioned in Right Ginza 15.5. In the 1012 Questions, S'haq Ziwa or Adam S'haq Ziwa (literally "Adam was Bright Radiance") is equated with Adam Kasia.
Shingilan (or Šingilan-Uthra) – mentioned in Qolasta prayer 105 and Mandaean Book of John 1 and 69. According to Mandaean Book of John 1, "Šingilan-Uthra takes the incense holder and brings it before the Mana."
Yukašar – mentioned in Qolasta prayers 53, 54, 55, 64, 77, and 343
Yaha-Yaha – mentioned in Qolasta prayer 15
Zha-Zha – mentioned in Qolasta prayer 15

In other texts
In the Mandaean Book of John, Etinṣib Ziwa is an uthra who starts a battle against Nbaṭ.

Gupna
In various Mandaean texts, several heavenly beings are described as personified grapevines (gupna) in the World of Light. For example, Right Ginza 15.8 lists the following gupnas in order:
Taureil (Taurʿil) – also mentioned in Qolasta prayers 379 and 381. Right Ginza 4 identifies Taureil as another name for Anan Anṣab. According to Right Ginza 15.8, the gupna Taureil "rests at the river of the pure Tarwan."
Rwaz (Ruaz) – also mentioned in Right Ginza 6 and 15.7, and in Qolasta prayers 71, 117, 196, 212, and 379
Yusmir – also mentioned in Mandaean Book of John 62 and Qolasta prayers 14, 18, 28, 52, 171, and 379. According to Right Ginza 15.8, the gupna Yusmir "rests upon the earth of Sam Ziwa."
Šarhabeil (Šarhabʿil) – also described as the Great First Radiance in Qolasta prayers 25 and 381. In Right Ginza 18, Šarhabeil and her husband Šurbai were the only survivors after the world was destroyed during the second epoch of the universe. According to Right Ginza 15.8, the gupna Šarhabeil "rests upon the earth of Hibil Ziwa."
Šar (Shar; literal meaning: 'he was firm') – also mentioned in Qolasta prayers 36 and 374. Šar-Ziwa is mentioned in Qolasta prayer 372. Also identified with Hibil Ziwa. According to Right Ginza 15.8, the gupna Šar "rests upon the earth of the First Life."
Pirun – also mentioned in Qolasta prayers 36, 374, and 379 and in the first chapter of the Mandaean Book of John. Pirun is described as a banner (drabsha) in Qolasta prayer 333, and as a "torrent" (river) in Qolasta prayer 378.
Yawar is identified in Right Ginza 15.8 as "the first Gupna."

Yusmir, Šar, and Pirun are also mentioned in the first chapter of the Mandaean Book of John.

Right Ginza 17.1 mentions Šarat (literal meaning: 'she was firm') as a gupna. Šarat-Niṭupta is mentioned in Mandaean Book of John 68, and Šahrat is mentioned in Qolasta prayer 188.

In Mandaeism, vines are used to symbolize believers, or 'those of the true faith'.

See also
Angels in Judaism
Angels in Islam
Jinn in Islam
Christian angelology
Mandaean cosmology
Yazata in Zoroastrianism
Sukkal in Mesopotamian mythology
Kami in Shinto religion
Asiet Malkia
Ziwa (Aramaic)

References

 
Mandaeism
Angels
Middle Eastern legendary creatures
Mandaic words and phrases
Classes of angels